The Man Who Won is a 1923 American silent Western film directed by William A. Wellman. It was produced and distributed by the Fox Film Corporation. It is now a lost film.

Cast
 Dustin Farnum - Wild Bill
 Jacqueline Gadsden - Jessie
 Lloyd Whitlock - "Lord" James
 Ralph Cloninger - Scipio, aka "Zip"
 Mary Warren - Birdie
 Pee Wee Holmes - Toby Jenks
 Harvey Clark - Sunny Oaks
 Lon Poff - Sandy Joyce
 Andy Waldron - Minkie
 Ken Maynard - Conroy
 Muriel McCormac -
 Mickey McBan - the Twins
 Bob Marks - The Drunkard

See also
 1937 Fox vault fire
 List of Fox Film films

References

External links
 
 

1923 films
Films directed by William A. Wellman
1923 Western (genre) films
Fox Film films
American black-and-white films
Lost Western (genre) films
Lost American films
1923 lost films
Silent American Western (genre) films
1920s American films